Interstate 17 (I-17) is a north–south Interstate Highway entirely within the US state of Arizona. I-17's southern terminus lies in Phoenix, at I-10, and its northern terminus is in Flagstaff, at Milton Road north of I-40.

Most of I-17 is known as the Arizona Veterans Highway. In the Phoenix metropolitan area, it is mostly known as the Black Canyon Freeway, however, the southern  are part of the Maricopa Freeway. The portion of the highway south of Cordes Lakes was built along the alignment of State Route 69 (SR 69), while the northern part was built along old SR 79's alignment. The final section of I-17 was completed in 1978.

The highway features several scenic view exits along its route that overlook the many mountains and valleys in northern Arizona.

Route description

(It is accompanied by frontage roads for most of this portion, and they carry the Black Canyon Highway name to distinguish from the freeway status.) At the Durango Curve southwest of downtown, between the 19th Avenue and Buckeye Road interchanges, it picks up the designation Maricopa Freeway all the way to the southern terminus at the second I-10 junction. It is one of the metropolitan area's primary freeways. It has two interchanges with I-10 in Phoenix.

I-17 has the unusual distinction of starting at approximately milepost 194 instead of at milepost 0. This is a holdover from Arizona's old system of marking mileposts, where a branching route would continue the milepost numbering of its original host, instead of starting over at zero. I-17 inherited its milepost locations from SR 69, which the freeway replaced between Phoenix and Cordes Junction. SR 69's mileposting was such that it coincided with US 89's mileposting, which was 201.6 where the two routes intersected. When I-17 was constructed, the existing mileposting for SR 69 was retained.

History

The I-17 corridor roughly follows the Apache Trail, a trail that traversed the Superstition Mountains used by indigenous peoples of the area as well as stagecoaches in the 20th century. The first stagecoach route through Black Canyon was established in 1878 between Cañon (now Black Canyon City) and Prescott. A later highway through White Spar from Wickenburg to Yarnell was improved in 1925 and incorporated into US 89 in 1926.

In 1936, SR 69 was established as a state route from Phoenix north to Prescott. The road was completed by 1940 to Prescott. In 1954, a new route north to Flagstaff was established as SR 79. In May 1956, the Black Canyon Highway from Phoenix to Flagstaff was completed, but not to Interstate standards. It was incorporated into the new Interstate Highway System, established by the federal government later that year, and designated as part of I-17.

The first interchange on the Black Canyon Freeway was built in 1950 west of downtown Phoenix and was extended to Grand Avenue in 1957. The freeway was extended to McDowell Road by 1971 and out of the Phoenix suburbs by 1974, at a cost of $33 million. By 1971, I-17 had been completed from Phoenix northward to Camp Verde where a short stretch had not been completed to standards. The stretch from SR 279 (now SR 260) north to SR 179 was also complete. The largest section yet to be completed was from SR 179 north to Flagstaff. This segment was still just a two-lane roadway, but it did have full traffic interchanges built at crossroads. The portion from I-40 south to the Flagstaff Municipal Airport had been completed by this time. The final section of I-17, near Camp Verde and Montezuma Castle, began construction in February 1977 and opened to traffic in August 1978.

In 1993, officials in Arizona proposed an extension of I-17 to connect with I-15 in Utah.

The existing interchange with Happy Valley Road in Phoenix was converted to a diverging diamond interchange (DDI). The project was finished in the fall of 2020.

Future
Due to increasing weekend traffic on I-17 between the Phoenix area and northern Arizona, ADOT plans to widen a  section of freeway between Anthem and Sunset Point Rest Area. The current span is only four lanes wide and is subject to frequent traffic jams on weekends as motorists travel to and from Sedona, Flagstaff, or other high country destinations. A third lane will be added in both directions between Anthem and Black Canyon City, but due to the mountainous topography north of Black Canyon City to Sunset Point, two flex lanes will be added in a separate carriageway next to the existing southbound lanes. The lanes would be allocated depending on peak traffic direction. Gates or a similar mechanism would control access to these lanes. Construction is scheduled to begin in 2022 and work will be completed in 2025.

Exit list

Former business route

State Business Route 17 (also known as SR 17 Bus.) was a former  business loop of I-17 that served the west side of Black Canyon City, Arizona. SR 17 Bus. followed Old Black Canyon Highway (formerly SR 69 before I-17 replaced most of the route between Phoenix and Cordes Junction) from exit 242 south of town at a diamond interchange to another diamond interchange at exit 244 north of town. The business route was subsequently transferred from state to local maintenance and because of ADOT's policy of not signing business loops on nonstate maintained roadways, the route was decommissioned in 2011.

Major intersections

See also

 Roads and freeways in metropolitan Phoenix
 Interstate 19

References

External links

 I-17 at ArizonaRoads.com
 Google Maps I-17

017
17
17
Transportation in Maricopa County, Arizona
Transportation in Yavapai County, Arizona
Transportation in Coconino County, Arizona